The Conference on Information Technology, Organisations and Teams (CITOT) was held in 2007 and 2009.

In this conference, Information Technology and its application in organizations and teams is discussed. Subjects like evolution of Web technologies, small display devices as well as mobile and groupware systems are also subject of analysis and discussion.

CITOT 2007 conference received 35 papers. From those papers 10 were accepted as full and small papers, 3 were accepted as posters and 4 as workshop papers (2 workshops). The conference also has a workshop with a tutorial presentation about web Services and PHP (Bruno Pedro) and one invited speaker (Paulo Trezentos, Caixa Magica).

In 2007, the program committee included members from Europe, America, Australia and Africa:
Anders Morch, University of Oslo (Norway),
Carina Ihlstrom Eriksson, University College of Halmstad (Sweden),
Carlos J. Costa, ISCTE (Portugal),
Clay Spinuzzi, University of Texas at Austin (USA),
Gitesh K. Raikundalia, Victoria University, Australia,
Hanne Westh Nicolajsen, Technical University of Denmark (Denmark),
Jose Leopoldo Nhampossa, Eduardo Mondlane University (Mozambique),
Kalogiannakis Michail, University Paris 5 (France) and
Petter Nielsen, Telenor (Norway)

In 2007, the reviewers were:
António Maia, Universidade Aberta, Lisboa (Portugal),
Manuela Aparício, ATML, Lisboa (Portugal),
Mario Tavares, ISCTE, Lisboa (Portugal),
Silvia Jorge, Loures Municipality, Lisboa (Portugal) and
Stephen Burgess, Victoria University (Australia)

In 2007, Organization Committee was composed of:
Manuela Aparício, ATML, Lisboa (Portugal),
Pedro Costa, IADE (Instituto de Artes Visuais, Design e Marketing), Lisboa (Portugal),
Rita Coruche, Lusocredito (Portugal) and
Maria Filomena Pereira, Lusocredito (Portugal).

CITOT 2007 was sponsored by LaSDI - Laboratory of Simulation and Dynamic Interaction, from ADETTI. CITOT 2009 was sponsored by ERP/ITML project.

External links 
 CITOT2007
 CITOT2009

Academic conferences
Information systems conferences